Rajkumar Roat (born 26 June 1992) is an Indian politician serving as Member of Rajasthan Legislative Assembly (MLA), representing the Chorasi constituency. He is the Member of Bhartiya Tribal Party and in 2018 he was elected as MLA winning by 14000 votes.

Early life 
He was born in Dungarpur, Rajasthan. He belongs to Bhil tribal community.

Political career 
Roat was elected as the youngest MLA in the 2018 Rajasthan Legislative Assembly election. He contested the election from the Chorasi constituency for BTP party.

References

External links
 

1992 births
Bharatiya Tribal Party politicians
Living people
Bhil people
People from Dungarpur
Rajasthan MLAs 2018–2023